Jan Kramer (16 February 1913 – 10 February 1997) was a Dutch rower. He competed in the men's coxless pair event at the 1936 Summer Olympics.

References

1913 births
1997 deaths
Dutch male rowers
Olympic rowers of the Netherlands
Rowers at the 1936 Summer Olympics
Sportspeople from Utrecht (city)
20th-century Dutch people